Greg the Bunny is an American television sitcom that originally aired on Fox in 2002. It starred Seth Green and a hand puppet named Greg the Bunny, originally invented by the team of Sean S. Baker, Spencer Chinoy and Dan Milano. Milano and Chinoy wrote and co-produced the Fox show. The show was spun off from The Greg the Bunny Show, a series of short segments that aired on the Independent Film Channel, which were based on the Public-access television cable TV show Junktape. A show spin-off, called Warren the Ape, premiered on June 14, 2010, on MTV.

Plot
In the FOX show, Greg was the co-star of a children's television show called Sweetknuckle Junction. Like The Muppet Show, Greg the Bunny treated puppets as though they were real creatures within the reality of the show. Although in this show, they were treated as a racial minority (who prefer to be called by the politically correct term "fabricated Americans"), sometimes struggling against second-class citizenship.

Characters

Humans
 Gilbert "Gil" Bender (played by Eugene Levy) – The overwhelmed TV producer and director of Sweetknuckle Junction and the father of Jimmy Bender. He expects Jimmy to succeed in his life.
 Jimmy Bender (played by Seth Green) – The human roommate of Greg the Bunny and the son of Gil Bender. He was a former pool man before he started working with his father where he hooked Greg up for a part on Sweetknuckle Junction. After Greg lands the part on the show, Jimmy becomes the production assistant to his father. In "SK-2.0," Jimmy temporarily became a creative consultant to help modernize the show. He went back to his production assistant job after "SK-2.0" caused the test audience children to have seizures and the network getting lawsuits from the parents of the children.
 Alison Kaiser (played by Sarah Silverman) – The network executive that Gil Bender works for. She used to work at PBS.
 Jack Mars (played by Bob Gunton) – An actor and Vietnam War veteran who plays Junction Jack, the railroad engineer host of Sweetknuckle Junction. Even though he has a distaste for puppets off-camera, Jack is the drinking buddy of Warren DeMontague and Count Frederick Blah. In "SK-2.0," Jimmy's filming of the alter-ego of "Sweetknuckle Junction" called "SK-2.0" had Junction Jack converted to a cyborg named Cybo-Jack who also wears a rocket pack. After the viewing of "SK-2.0" by the test audience children caused them to have seizures and their parents to file lawsuits against the network, Jack started playing Junction Jack again. In "Jewel Heist," it is revealed that Jack grew up on a farm where his job was to castrate the bull cattle. In "Surprise," it is revealed that Jack can shoot better when he dresses like a woman. In "Sock Like Me," Jack's reason for his puppet distaste is because his mother had an affair with a puppet while he was a child. This led to Jack's mom leaving Jack and his dad where she ran off with the puppet.
 "Dottie" Sunshine (played by Dina Waters) – An actress who is the beautiful human co-host of Sweetknuckle Junction. She is more comfortable around most puppets than any other person. In "SK-2.0", Dottie wore a sexy outfit. When "SK-2.0" fails to pan out where it caused the children test audience to have seizures and the network getting lawsuits from the parents of the children, Dottie goes back to her original outfit. In "Jewel Heist," it is revealed that Dottie is allergic to bees. In "Greg Gets Puppish," it is revealed that Dottie had a puppet best friend growing up where Dottie later confesses that the puppet in question was her maid growing up.

Puppets
There have been many puppets that have been used on the show. The ones who are exclusive to the show have been designed and built at Animated Engineering McAvene Designs. Several of these puppets that appeared on the FOX show were reused from the children's direct-to-video series The Adventures of Timmy the Tooth like some members of the Gingivitis Gang appearing as background crew members.

 Greg the Bunny (performed by Dan Milano) – A rabbit who is the title character of the show. Greg underwent many changes throughout the course of his career. The original Greg had buttons for eyes and did not have a mouth. In the Fox series, he was given a moving mouth and plastic eyes for the later episodes. When Greg the Bunny returned to IFC, his button eyes were restored and he lost his moving mouth. On the show, he acts mostly as comic relief, and jokes are made at his expense (particularly by Warren) about how he cannot act and that he's just there to look cute. In the IFC series, he lives with Spencer Chinoy and Sean S. Baker. In the Fox series, he lives with Jimmy Bender. Jimmy was the one who got his father Gil to give Greg a job on Sweetknuckle Junction where he portrayed himself as the nephew to the former character Rochester Rabbit co-starring alongside Junction Jack, Dottie, Count Blah, and Warren DeMontague. In "SK-2.0," the Sweetknuckle Junction alter-ego "SK-2.0" had Greg the Bunny playing "G. the B." When "SK-2.0" fails to pan out where it caused the children test audience to have seizures and the network getting lawsuits from the parents of the children, he becomes Greg the Bunny again. In "Greg Gets Puppish," Greg gets the Puppish name of Bizzleburp from Hurbada Hymena. In the MTV series spin-off "Warren the Ape," Greg makes an appearance when Warren spends time with him to become sexually abstinent. However, it ends up with the clueless Greg being arrested as a pedophile and losing his virginity while in jail. He was built by Paul McAvene.
 Warren DeMontague (performed by Dan Milano) – A helmet-wearing ape who is the second main character on the show later starring in his own series Warren the Ape. He is the only character who uses a separate character name on Sweetknuckle Junction playing Professor Ape. He portrays himself as a veteran stage actor trying to make a new name for himself while having several substance-related vices. He initially despises working with Greg the Bunny because of his lack of stage experience. Warren has an agent named Maury who Warren tends to call up for any acting opportunities. In "SK-2.0," there were fat jokes made about Warren which caused him to strangle the test audience child that insulted him enough for Gil and Alison to break it up. Jimmy's plans for the alter-ego of "Sweetknuckle Junction" called "SK-2.0" had him telling Warren to shed some pounds. During the filming of "SK-2.0" under Jimmy's supervision, Warren had to operate as "Prof Meister Ape" with Gil eventually telling him to say his lines with feeling or else he'll rip the stitches that were placed in his rear and suck out the fat with an industrial vacuum. When "SK-2.0" fails to pan out where it caused the children test audience to have seizures and the network getting lawsuits from the parents of the children, he portrays Professor Ape again. In "Jewel Heist," it is revealed that Warren had a relationship with Farrah Fawcett.
 Fredrick "Count Blah" Blah (performed by Dan Milano in the IFC show, Drew Massey on the FOX show) – A vampire who is another actor that had worked with Warren DeMontague many years ago. He is a parody of Count von Count of Sesame Street fame, although he regularly claims that Count von Count stole his act and took away his fame. In the IFC series, Spencer often asks Blah when directing to stop saying "Blah." This makes Blah very upset, as he insists that Blah is his gimmick. Blah was another puppet who underwent changes between series. In the IFC series, he has lighter skin and smaller eyes than he does on the Fox show and his hands are those of the assistant puppeteers.
 Tardy Turtle (performed by Victor Yerrid) – A turtle who is exclusive to the FOX show. He is portrayed as a slow turtle (hence his name), in the sense that he is regularly late as well as likely being mentally handicapped and often says very random things ("Crayons taste like purple," "... the green ones make me horny," "... drumsticks can also be chicken") in the manner of Ralph Wiggum from The Simpsons. Tardy also ends some of his sentences or when he is frightened with a high-pitched squeal much like Leonardo DiCaprio's character Arnie Grape in What's Eating Gilbert Grape. In the opening credits, it's said that he graduated from Harvard at the head of his class, indicating that there is a possibility that he is a Savant. When FOX cancelled the series, the puppet was "stolen" and FOX claimed copyright to it. Someone that resembled Tardy makes an appearance on the IFC DVD in one of the pre-episode audio introductions.
 Susan Monster (performed by James Murray) – A full-bodied furry purple monster with six breasts and a male voice who is exclusive to the FOX series. She works as an office worker at the network where Sweetknuckle Junction is filmed. In "Welcome to Sweetknuckle Junction," Susan was among the puppets who auditioned for Rochester Rabbit's part. In "Surprise," Susan is revealed to have a habit of eating stray cats. When FOX cancelled the series, they claimed copyright to Susan Monster's puppet.
 Rochester Rabbit (performed by James Murray) – A gruff rabbit born in 1946 who was the previous puppet host of Sweetknuckle Junction for 15 years until he was fired due to forgetting his lines at his age and was replaced by Greg the Bunny. He is mentioned to have 43 kids. After Greg the Bunny landed Rochester's part on Sweetknuckle Junction as Rochester's nephew, Rochester crashed the filming of the show and threatened to cut him up with scissors only for him to be knocked out by Jimmy during the on-set skirmish between Warren and Jack. In "Rabbit Redux," Greg's recurring nightmares of Rochester burying him alive causes Greg to want to patch things up with him. Greg and Jack find Rochester selling Stars Maps with Jack hoping to get back the meatloaf pan that Rochester borrowed from him. Rochester rants about how Greg stealing his part on Sweetknuckle Junction caused him to lose his home and go broke. Greg convinced Gil to rehire Rochester which resulted in Rochester behind hired as a janitor. Greg even fakes an injury so that Rochester can get a part on the Thanksgiving episode of Sweetknuckle Junction, where he dances during one of the musical numbers until he suddenly dies from a heart attack. During the memorial service/roast, some jokes are made about Rochester followed by a presentation where Rochester got hurt during each episode. When it came to Warren's talk about Rochester, the cigar that was placed in Rochester's dead mouth started to burn Rochester's dead body.
 Cranky (performed by Victor Yerrid) – A crew member who is often annoyed at things. He is a recycled version of Cavity Goon from The Adventures of Timmy the Tooth.
 Dr. Aben Mitchell (performed by Drew Massey) – Aben is the leader of the Pro-Puppet Movement and an advocate on Puppet Rights. Being a Live-Hand Puppet, Drew Massey is assisted in performing him by James Murray.
 Gay Bear (performed by Drew Massey) – A bear that acts gay. He was among the puppets that auditioned for Rochester Rabbit's part on Sweetknuckle Junction in the episode "Welcome to Sweetknuckle Junction."
 Mr. Hygiene (performed by Victor Yerrid) –
 Hurbada Hymena (performed by Drew Massey) – The leader of the militant puppet group called International Puppets Alliance.
 Mushma and Ratagaba (performed by James Murray and Drew Massey) – Two members of the International Puppets Alliance that work for Hurbada. Mushma is a furry one-eyed monster and Ratagaba is a tall-headed goat-like creature.
 Crippled Writer (performed by Victor Yerrid) – A leg brace-wearing writer at the network who is exclusive to the FOX series. In "The Singing Mailman," the Crippled Writer's forearm crutches were once stolen by Leo Kornelly after he had a fall and nobody has come to help the Crippled Writer up.
 Jamaican Guy (performed by James Murray) – A Jamaican puppet who provides the piano music for Sweetknuckle Junction. Similar to Count Blah saying "Blah," Jamaican Guy says "Mon" at the end of his sentences as seen in "Dottie Heat" during their card game with Warren, Jack, a dog puppet, and an unnamed crew member.
 The Wumpus (performed by Dan Milano) – A monster character exclusive to the IFC show. He is a parody of the Sesame Street Monsters and is very clumsy. The Wumpus, created by Chris Bergoch, first appeared in the early nineties in a Bergoch short.
 Pal Friendlies (performed by Dan Milano) – A character exclusive to the IFC show. He is the talent agent for all the puppets who work on the show, although he is a very ineffective one. He also doubles as a lawyer in some episodes.
 Elephant Man (performed by Paul McGinnis) – A puppet character that is modeled after Joseph Merrick who is exclusive to the IFC show.

Background and production
Junktape was a half-hour, bi-weekly Public-access television show created by Sean S. Baker, Spencer Chinoy and Dan Milano. The show aired on New York City's Manhattan Neighborhood Network, Monday nights at 11:30 pm. Eventually, the show got the attention of the Independent Film Channel and given its own series of regular segments starring one of the main characters from Junktape, Greg the Bunny. The Greg the Bunny Show on IFC involved Greg and other characters introducing independent films being screened by using skits that parodied the films.

The Fox show made its debut in March 2002 and its last episode aired in August 2002, with two episodes unaired. Its failure was largely ascribed to the show runner and networks' seeming cluelessness as to the direction they wanted the show to take. The network promoted Greg the Bunny as a puppet show for adults, but within the show itself, they insisted on toning down its edgier aspects. The creators felt these changes caused the show to lose something, and gave it much more of a traditional sitcom feel. The show runner and network also wanted to focus the show more on the human cast, while the creators maintained that the puppets were the heart of the show. Despite these problems, the series acquired a significant cult following, and was eventually released on DVD in 2004.

In August 2005, Greg the Bunny returned to the IFC, in a series of short segments, spoofing both old and new movies such as Annie Hall, Miller's Crossing, Barton Fink, Fargo, Blue Velvet, Easy Rider and Pulp Fiction. The cast for these segments primarily features puppets Greg and Warren Demontague with appearances from Count Blah, new character Pal Friendlies, and returning character The Wumpus. Tardy the Turtle and Susan were unable to appear in the IFC series because they were the property of FOX.

Episodes
The episodes appear in production code order on the DVD release.

Unaired pilot

Series (2002–2004)

IFC shorts (2005)
Greg the Bunny returned as a series of 12-minute shorts that aired on IFC, starting in August 2005.

IFC shorts (2006)

Home media
The original "Greg the Bunny: The Complete Series" DVD was released October 19, 2004.

The IFC series was partially released as "Greg the Bunny: Best of the Film Parodies" October 24, 2006.

The remainder of the IFC series released as "The Passion of Greg the Bunny: Best of the Film Parodies, Vol. 2" May 6, 2008.

Appearances in other shows
 Greg the Bunny made a guest segment on Mad TV (episode 719, aired 2002): in it, Greg, the jaded pro, deals with an audition for a minor part from his psychotic first drama teacher.
 Greg the Bunny appeared in the Duel Masters episode "Kokujo Strikes Back." He was portrayed as the world's second best duelist.
 Peter also mentioned Greg the Bunny at the beginning of the Family Guy comeback episode "North by North Quahog", when he was listing the shows that Family Guy was cancelled to "make room for" (roughly shows that were cancelled and their entire run was between the original cancellation and return of Family Guy). As he says "Greg the Bunny", he moves his head toward Chris, referencing the fact that Seth Green, one of the stars in Greg the Bunny, is also Chris' voice actor.
 An original Greg the Bunny short was created by Dan Milano for the 100th episode of the podcast "Star Wars Action News". While no other puppets were featured, the skit showed Greg playing with his favorite Star Wars action figures. Creator Dan Milano also was featured in a second, separate, video segment.
Footage of the show can be seen in Sean Baker's Starlet and The Florida Project.

References

External links

 
 Warren the Ape on MTV
 Greg the Bunny Fox DVD site
 
 Greg the Bunny Independent Film Channel page
 Official Myspace page
 Greg the Bunny page from Shout! Factory
  Interview with Greg, Warren and co-creator Dan Milano, by David Salcido

2002 American television series debuts
2005 American television series endings
2000s American sitcoms
2000s American workplace comedy television series
American public access television shows
American television series revived after cancellation
American television shows featuring puppetry
English-language television shows
Fox Broadcasting Company original programming
IFC (American TV channel) original programming
Television shows about apes
Television series about rabbits and hares
Television series about television
Television series about turtles
Television series by Steven Levitan Productions
Television series by 20th Century Fox Television
Television shows set in Los Angeles